Ceylonite (first cited 1793) and pleonaste (first cited 1801) or pleonast are  dingy blue or  grey to black varieties of spinel. Ceylonite, named for the island of Ceylon, is a ferroan spinel with Mg:Fe from 3:1 and 1:1, and little or no ferric iron. Pleonaste is named from the Greek for 'abundant,' for its many crystal forms, and is distinguished chemically by low Mg:Fe ratios of approximately 1:3. It is sometimes used as a gemstone.

Composition

The mineral ceylonite has the chemical composition of (Mg, Fe2+) Al2O4, putting it into a group of minerals known as the spinels, or the oxide spinels. The oxide spinels have a formula of the model [A][B]2O4; where [A] is commonly Fe2+, Mg2+, or Mn2+, and [B] is Fe3+, Al3+, or Cr3+.

Structure

Ceylonite has the structural formula [A]Al2O4, where [A] cation is Mg2+ or Fe2+. This formula creates a face centered cubic Bravais lattice, with a space group of Fd3m. The point symmetry can be three possibilities; 4*3m, 3*m, or mm.
Within the oxygen sub-lattice of ceylonite, the Mg2+ ions occupy tetrahedral 4c symmetry positions, and the Al3+ ions occupy octahedral 8f site. This allows for the remaining octahedral site to be open for defects, causing a variety in structure and physical properties.

Ceylonite can actually undergo a solid solution series in which the composition changes, but it is still ceylonite. Magnesium rich ceylonite can undergo an increase in iron that will replace the magnesium cation in the A-block, therefore making the new composition Fe2+Al2O4. The chemistry changes, but the mineral technically remains ceylonite.

Occurrence

The ceylonite first discovered on the island of Ceylon, modern day Sri Lanka, was found imbedded in calcareous spar, and accompanied by pyrite and micas. The crystals were located in a low lying dried up river, and were relatively shallow in the soil; 8 to 10 inches. On one side of the bank a mass of gneiss was exposed, on the other, a graphic granite vein.

The grains in the first discovered ceylonite looked of compacted soils, leading one to believe they were perhaps sedimentary in formation. This was an early hypothesis, and did not hold true after further analysis.

The Mg-ceylonite has a much more reliable study of its geological occurrence. It is found in Mg and Al rich igneous rocks, as well as, metamorphic rock. Like many rocks and mineral, ceylonite is weathered and can be found in sedimentary rocks.

History
Ceylonite and pleonaste are historical terms in mineralogy. Nevertheless, both terms are used in the current mineralogical literature.

References

Ball, J.A., Murphy, S.T., Grimes, R.W., Bacorisen, D.,  Smith, R., Uberuaga, B.P., Sickafus, K.E., June 2008, Defect processes in MgAl2O4 spinel, Solid State Sciences, 10, 6, 717-724.
Desa, M., Ramana, M.V., Ramprasad, T., 30 June 2006, Seafloor spreading magnetic anomalies south off Sri Lanka, Marine Geology, 229, 34, 227-240.
King, R. J. (2004). Minerals explained 40: The spinels. Geology Today, 20(5), 194-200.
Sickafus, K. E., Wills, J. M. and Grimes, N. W. (1999), Structure of Spinel. Journal of the American Ceramic Society.
Skeen, George J.A. (1887) Journal of the Ceylon Branch of the Royal Asiatic Society, Volume IL-Part L No. 4, 97-98
Spinels, 1992, Physics and Chemistry of the Earth, 18, 105-125.
Gemdat ceylonite
Mindat ceylonite
Mindat pleonaste

Spinel gemstones